Elections were held on 20 September 1950  for the councils of most of the counties, cities and towns of the Republic of Ireland.

The exceptions were three councils which had been elected in 1948: Dublin County Council and Kerry County Council, which were reinstated in 1948 after earlier suspension; and in Tramore, which gained town commissioners in 1948 for the first time. Bad weather on 20 September prevented election officials reaching the islands of Inishbofin, Inishmeane, Owey and Tory in County Donegal, so polling was held there on a later date.

Results

References 

Local elections
Ireland
1950